St Mawes was a rotten borough in Cornwall, England.  It returned two Members of Parliament (MPs) to the House of Commons of England from 1562 to 1707, to the House of Commons of Great Britain from 1707 to 1800, and to the House of Commons of the United Kingdom until it was abolished by the Great Reform Act in 1832.

History
The borough consisted of the manor of St Mawes, a decayed fishing port and market town in the west of Cornwall. Like most of the Cornish boroughs enfranchised or re-enfranchised during the Tudor period, it was a rotten borough from the start.

The right to vote rested with the portreeve and "resident burgesses or free tenants", making it essentially a scot and lot borough (there were 87 voters in 1831), but the control of the "patron" was entirely secure. In practice the patron always worked in close collusion with the Crown, and the members returned were generally court nominees throughout the borough's existence. In the 1760s the Boscawen family (the Viscounts Falmouth) were considered to have the main influence over the choice of one member and Robert Nugent over the other; by the time of the Great Reform Act, the patronage had passed to the Marquess of Buckingham.

In 1831, the borough had a population of 459, and 95 houses.

Members of Parliament

1562–1629

1640–1832

Notes

References

Robert Beatson, A Chronological Register of Both Houses of Parliament (London: Longman, Hurst, Res & Orme, 1807) 
D. Brunton & D. H. Pennington, Members of the Long Parliament (London: George Allen & Unwin, 1954)
Cobbett's Parliamentary history of England, from the Norman Conquest in 1066 to the year 1803 (London: Thomas Hansard, 1808) 
 Maija Jansson (ed.), Proceedings in Parliament, 1614 (House of Commons) (Philadelphia: American Philosophical Society, 1988)
J. E. Neale, The Elizabethan House of Commons (London: Jonathan Cape, 1949)
J. Holladay Philbin, Parliamentary Representation 1832 – England and Wales (New Haven: Yale University Press, 1965)
 Henry Stooks Smith, The Parliaments of England from 1715 to 1847, Volume 3 (London: Simpkin, Marshall & Co, 1850)  
 
 

Constituencies of the Parliament of the United Kingdom established in 1562
Constituencies of the Parliament of the United Kingdom disestablished in 1832
Parliamentary constituencies in Cornwall (historic)
Rotten boroughs
St Mawes